William Thompson (2 December 1805 – 17 February 1852) was an Irish naturalist celebrated for his founding studies of the natural history of Ireland, especially in ornithology and marine biology.  Thompson published numerous notes on the distribution, breeding, eggs, habitat, song, plumage, behaviour, nesting and food of birds. These formed the basis of his four-volume The Natural History of Ireland, and were much used by contemporary and later authors such as Francis Orpen Morris.

Early years
Thompson was born in the booming maritime city of Belfast, Ireland, the eldest son of a linen merchant, whose wealth would later permit Thompson to fund his own research without an academic affiliation.  Thompson attended the newly formed Royal Belfast Academical Institution, where he got a degree in Biological Science. Founded by, amongst others, John Templeton, the school had a strong natural history section that produced a cohort of prominent naturalists.  In 1826 he went on a Grand Tour accompanied by cousin George Langtry, a Fortwilliam, Belfast shipowner. They starting in the Netherlands then travelled through Belgium down the Rhine to Switzerland and on to Rome and Naples. They returned via Florence, Geneva and Paris. Thompson's first scientific paper, The Birds of the Copeland Islands, was published in 1827 shortly after he joined the Belfast Natural History Society. In these years he became a member of the Belfast Literary Society.

Personal life
William Thompson was a man of regular habits. For four hours after breakfast he was engaged in scientific research, preparation for the press and correspondence. Exercise for two or three hours followed. The interval between dinner and tea was given to the literature of the day and when the claims of local societies left him free he would retire to the study for two or three additional hours of scientific work. With spring came a visit to London where he enlarged his taste for literature, history, biography and the fine arts as well as science. He also visited most of the scenic parts of England and Scotland. In the summer the seaside with family and then in the Autumn tours with friends, attendance at meetings of the British Association and to shooting quarters in Scotland.

Research
Thompson contributed up-to-date information on the birds of Ireland to Selby's The Magazine of Zoology and Botany, The Annals of Natural History, The Magazine of Natural History, and the Annals and Magazine of Natural History, and prepared the first comprehensive list of Ireland's birds for the 1840 meeting of the British Association for the Advancement of Science at Glasgow. Other work, primarily about birds, was published in the Proceedings of the Zoological Society of London and the London and Edinburgh Philosophical Journal. These papers formed the basis of his seminal work—The Natural History of Ireland—published in four volumes between 1849 and 1851.

Birds

Thompson either owned or had access to a very comprehensive ornithological library exemplared by the Ornithological Dictionary, Le Règne Animal, Selby's Illustrations of British Ornithology, Coenraad Jacob Temminck's Manuel d'ornithologie ou Tableau systématique des oiseaux qui se trouvent en Europe (Sepps & Dufour, Amsterdam, Paris 1815–40), William Edward Parry, 1821 Journal of a Voyage for the Discovery of a North-West Passage from the Atlantic to the Pacific; Performed in the years 1819–'20, in His Majecty's Ships Hecla and Griper ... with an Appendix Containing the Scientific and Other Observations London (1821), William John Swainson and John Richardson, 1831. Fauna boreali-Americana: part second, the birds, Charles Lucien Bonaparte's Synopsis of the Birds of the United States, Peter Simon Pallas' Zoographia Russo-Asiatica. 
His other tool was his own and other private bird collections and those of the museums in Belfast and Dublin.
 
The major bird publications are the 1841 Report on the fauna of Ireland (Vertebrata) for the British Association for the Advancement of Science which is an early biogeographic work contrasting the vertebrates of Britain and Ireland. Thompson notes that with a few exceptions the native birds of Britain as then accepted by Jardine and Selby are all found in Ireland. 
 and 
The Natural History of Ireland is, in the section on birds,  a Monograph with a literary style, sometimes anecdotal giving information on anatomy, plumage, behaviour, nesting and breeding, seasonality and distribution.

Thompson documented many rare in Ireland bird species, variously collected by his network of correspondents. Among birds these included the first Irish occurrences of Bonaparte's Gull and American Bittern.He was a sceptical observer writing on the Red Kite 'The name of "Kite" appears commonly in the catalogues of birds given in the Statistical Surveys of the Irish counties, and elsewhere; but, as the larger species of the falconidae are in some places called Kite and Glead, as well as Goshawk or Goose-hawk, there can be no doubt that the buzzard, or some common species, was meant.

Marine biology
In 1834 Thompson began studying the distribution of marine animals in space (depth range) and time (seasonality). His first research was with Edward Forbes conducting dredging in the Irish Sea. Other participants were Robert MacAndrew, John Gwyn Jeffreys, the Yoxford, Suffolk shell collector George Barlee (1794-1861) and his fellow Irishmen Robert Ball, Edmund Getty and George Crawford Hyndman. In 1835 he travelled in France, Switzerland and Germany with Forbes. Then in 1841 he joined Forbes and Thomas Abel Brimage Spratt on the Beacon commanded by Thomas Graves and working in the Mediterranean and Aegean. The expedition lasted eighteen months and conducted more than one hundred dredging operations at depths varying from 1 to 130 fathoms, as well as shore-based studies. Thompson focused on the depth range of algae, his main collection of which is in the Ulster Museum herbarium and consists of five large albums containing specimens collected by Thompson himself, William Henry Harvey, Moon, D. Landsborough, Robert Ball, Thomas Coulter, George Crawford Hyndman, William McCalla and many others. His records are also reported by others such as Gifford (1853):- Griffithsia simplicifilum from "...Isle of Wight, in August, 1841, by Messers. R.Ball. and W. Thompson."

George Dickie's Flora of Ulster contains records of Thompson's frequent botanical contributions and his Hortus Siccus and he is mentioned in William Baird's Natural History of British Entomostraca.

Later years
Thompson corresponded extensively on all aspects of natural history with naturalists in both Britain and Ireland, including with zoologist Thomas Bell who was at the heart of the English scientific establishment and two of the "Grandees" of the Zoological Society, Nicholas Aylward Vigors, William Ogilby. 
 
As Thompson's reputation spread, information was passed to him by interested observers all over Ireland. However his health became poor around 1847 or 1848, when he was 42, and he suffered from heart trouble from 1847.  In 1852 Thompson died of a heart attack in London where he had been tended by his friends William Yarrell, author of British Birds, Edward Forbes, Edwin Lankester, of the Ray Society and George Busk. He died unmarried.

Excerpts from Thompson's letters and his notes were edited and published as the fourth volume of The Natural History of Ireland, which focused on invertebrates and non-avian vertebrates, by George Dickie, James Ramsey Garrett and Robert Patterson in 1856, four years after his death.

Works
Partial list from over eighty. A complete list is found in The Natural History of Ireland (see External Links).
1837 On the Pollan (Coregonus pollan Thompson) of Lough Neagh Magazine of zoology and botany 1:247-251 online

1833 on an immature specimen of the Long-tailed Manis (Manis tetradactyla, Linn.) from Sierra Leone. Proceedings of the Zoological Society of London II 28.online
1833 On the Occurrence of the Young of the Arctic Tern (Sterna Arctica, Temm.) in the North of Ireland Proceedings of the Zoological Society of London II:33   online
1833 On the Occurrence of the Black-headed Gull (Larus capistratus, Temm.) in the North of Ireland Proceedings of the Zoological Society of London II:33   online
1834 Notice of the cuckoo (Cuculus canorus  Linn.) Proceedings of the Zoological Society of London II:29    online
1834 Observations of some of native Mammalia, birds and fishes, including additions to the British fauna. List of land and freshwater Mollusca new to Ireland.Transactions of the Linnean Society of London Minute Book Linnean Society 1834 published 1837 online See also The London and Edinburgh philosophical magazine and journal of science. 5: 298 online. 
1835 on the Teredo navalis and Limnoria terebrans, as at present existing in certain localities on the coasts of the British Islands. Edinb. New Phil. J. 18: 121–130.
1835 [Catalogue of] Birds, fishes etc. new to the British and Irish Fauna Proceedings of the Zoological Society of London 3: 77–84. Proceedings of the Zoological Society of London II:77 online
1837 [On Vertebratae new to Science to Britain to Ireland etc] 52-63 Proceedings of the Zoological Society of London 1837:52-63 online
1838 III Contributions to the Natural History of Ireland No 5 On the Birds of the Order Insessores Annals of natural history 1:12-26 online
1838 On the Snowy Owl (Surnia nyctea Dum.) Annals of natural history 1:241-245 online
1838 On fishes new to Ireland Annals of natural history 1:348-359 online
1839 On a new Sub‐genus of Fishes, allied to Ophidium Transactions of the Zoological Society of London 1839:207-212 Plate XXXVIII online
1839 with Robert Patterson On some Snow Crystals observed on the 14th of January , 1838 Magazine of Natural History 3:107-122 online
1839 On fishes new to Ireland Annals of natural history 2:14-28 online
1840 Note on the occurrence at various times of the bottle-nosed whale (Hyperoodon butzkoph, Lancep.) on the coast of Ireland; and its nearly simultaneous appearance on different parts of the British coast in the autumn of 1839. Annals of natural history 4, 375–381.online
1839 On fishes; containing a notice of one species new to the British fauna and of others to the Irish fauna Annals of natural history 2:266-273 online
1839 On the breeding of the Woodcock (Scolopax rusticola in Ireland Annals of natural history 2:337-448 online
1839 Observations on several British Fishes including the Description of a new Species Annals of natural history 2:402-423
online
1840 Additions to the fauna of Ireland. Annals of natural history 5, 6–14. online
1840 Additions to the fauna of Ireland. Annals of natural history 5: 245–257.online
with Goodsir, J. 1840 Description of Limneus involutus Harvey MS. with an account of the anatomy of the animal. Annals of natural history 5: 22–25. online
1840 On the Mollusca of Ireland [Species Unica]. Annals of natural history 5:84 online
1840 Contributions towards a knowledge of the Mollusca Nudibranchia and Mollusca Tunicata of Ireland, with descriptions of apparently some new species of invertebrata. Annals of natural history 5: 84–102 Plate 2.online
1840 On a new genus of fishes from India. Annals of natural history, 4 (6), 184-187.online
1841 Report on the fauna of Ireland (Vertebrata) Report of the British Association for the Advancement of Science 1841 online
1840 On a minute alga which colours Ballydrain Lake, in the county of Antrim. Annals and Magazine of Natural History 5: 75-84, figs 1-3. online
1841 Catalogue of the land and freshwater Mollusca of Ireland. Annals & Magazine of Natural History 6: 16–34 online
1841 Catalogue of the land and freshwater Mollusca of Ireland. Annals & Magazine of Natural History 6: 109–126 online
1841 Catalogue of the land andfreshwater Mollusca of Ireland. Annals & Magazine of Natural History 6: 194–208 online
1841 Additions to the fauna of Ireland. Annals & Magazine of Natural History 7: 477–481 online
1841 Notes on British Char, Salmo Umbla, Linn., S. Salvelinus, Don. Annals & Magazine of Natural History 6: 444 –online
1842 Cycostoma elegans Lam. an Irish shell. Annals & Magazine of Natural History 8: 228.online
1842 Results of deep dredging off the Mull of Galloway, by Capt. Beechey, R.N.. Annals & Magazine of Natural History 10: 21–24.online
1843 Report on the fauna of Ireland: div. Invertebrata. Drawn up, at the request of the British Association. Rep. Meet. Br. Assoc. Advancem. Science London, 13: 245–291.online
1844 Additions to the fauna of Ireland. Annals & Magazine of Natural History 13: 430–440.online
1845 Additions to the fauna of Ireland, including descriptions of some apparently new species of Invertebrata. Annals & Magazine of Natural History 15: 308–322. online
1846 Notice of a bottle-nosed whale Hyperoodon butzkoph, Lancep. obtained in Belfast Bay in October 1845. Annals and Magazine of Natural History. 17, 150–153.online
1846 Additions to the fauna of Ireland, including species new to that of Britain; with notes on rare species. Annals and Magazine of Natural History. 18, 310–315. online
1846 Additions to the fauna of Ireland, including a few species unrecorded in that of Britain; with the description of an apparently new Glossiphonia. Annals & Magazine of Natural History 18: 383–397.online
1847 Note on the Teredo norvegica (T. navalis, Turton, not Linn), Xylophaga dorsalis, Limnoria terebrans and Chelura terebrans, combined in destroying the submerged wood-work at the harbour of Ardrossan on the coast of Ayrshire. Annals & Magazine of Natural History 20: 157–164.online
1847 Additions to the fauna of Ireland. Annals & Magazine of Natural History 20: 169–176.online
1848 Additions to the fauna of Ireland. Annals & Magazine of Natural History 1: 62–65.online
1849 Additions to the fauna of Ireland. Annals & Magazine of Natural History 3: 351–357.online
1851 Time of spawning of British Crustacea. Annals & Magazine of Natural History 7: 501–502.online
1853 Supplementary report on the fauna of Ireland. Report for the British Association for the Advancement of Science : 286–290.online
  Also published by Boehn, London.

Note. The pages Proceedings of the Zoological Society of London, The Magazine of Natural History and Annals & Magazine of Natural History all link to digitised versions of these works provided by Biodiversity Heritage Library.

Thompson was a Member of the Zoological Society of London and a Corresponding
Member of The Philadelphia Academy of Natural Sciences and the Boston Society of Natural History.

Species names honouring William Thompson
Lepeophtheirus thompsoni Baird, 1850 
Acipenser thompsoni Ball (in Thompson), 1856,4: 245. synonym  of Acipenser sturio (Linnaeus, 1758)
Bulimus thompsoni (Pfeiffer, 1845) in Pfeiffer, L. 1845. Descriptions of twenty-two new species of land-shells, belonging to the collection of Mr. H. Cuming. Proceedings of the Zoological Society of London 13: 63-68
Lepeophtheirus thompsoni Baird, 1850
Thaumantias thompsoni Forbes , 1841 , Ann. Nat. Hist. 
Meloscira thompsoni Harvey synononym of Lyngbya thompsonii (Harvey) in Hassall, A.H. (1845). A history of the British freshwater algae, including descriptions of the Desmideae and Diatomaceae. With upwards of one hundred plates, illustrating the various species. Vol. I. pp. [i]-viii, [i]-462, [ i , err.]. London, Edinburgh, Paris & Leipzig: S. Highley, H. Baillière; Sunderland & Knox; J.B. Baillière; T.O. Weigel.pdf
Spirillum thompsoni Hassall, A.H., 1845 A history of the British freshwater algae:278
Dolichospermum thompsoni Ralfs
Pterinea thompsoni Portlock, 1843 in Report on the geology of the county of Londonderry, and of parts of Tyrone and Fermanagh. Dublin, A. Milliken 1843.
Hypoplita thompsoni and Pagurus thompsoni Bell in A History of the British Stalk-eyed Crustacea. Paternoster Row, London: John Van Voorst. 1844–1853

Notes

References

Further reading

Morton, O. 1980. Three algal collections in the Ulster Museum Herbarium. Irish Nataturalists' Journal. 20: 33 – 37
Jackson, P.N.W. 2010. William Thompson (1805–1852): zoologist and biogeographer. Ir. Nat. J.: 30 119 – 122.
Ross, H.C.G. and Nash, R. 1985. The development of natural history in early nineteenth century Ireland. From Linnaeus to Darwin: commentaries on the history of biology and geology. Society for the history of Natural History, London.
Robert Patterson, 1856 Memoir of the Late William Thompson, Esq. President of the Natural and Philosophical Society of Belfast in The Natural History of Ireland Volume 4: Mammalia, reptiles and fishes. Also, invertebrata  online here at WikiSource s:Memoir of the Late William Thompson, Esq., President of the Natural and Philosophical Society of Belfast                                                                                                          *Fairley, J . 1975.An Irish Beast Book.  Blackstaff Press, Belfast.SBN 85640 090 4

External links
 
About Ireland pdfs of The Natural History of Ireland
National Portrait Gallery
Google Books Digitised The Natural History of Ireland
 

1805 births
1852 deaths
Irish ornithologists
19th-century Irish botanists
Scientists from Belfast
Irish naturalists